Al's Brain (or Al's Brain: A 3-D Journey Through the Human Brain) is a 10-minute 3D short film that was shown at the Orange County Fair, California in 2009.

Plot 
The film involves "Weird Al" Yankovic teaching about the brain and how it functions.

Cast 
 "Weird Al" Yankovic as a fictionalized version of himself and Phineaus Cage.
 Paul McCartney as First Man on the Street
 Patton Oswalt as Co-worker
 Thomas Lennon as Co-worker
 Fabio as Second Man on the Street
 Tim Heidecker and Eric Wareheim as Brain Stretchers
 Bob Bancroft as Norm Koslovsky
 Michael William Arnold as Timmy

Music video 
The short film includes a brand new song entitled "The Brain Song," in which the last few minute of the short are of the music video.

Release 
The short film was released to the public at the Orange County Fair 2009 airing from July 16 to August 15.

Home media 
The original song, "The Brain Song" was released on the Medium Rarities album, exclusive to the 2017 box set Squeeze Box.

References

External links
 

2009 short films
2009 films
American comedy short films
American animated short films
"Weird Al" Yankovic
2000s American films